Jenkins House, also known as The Grey Barn, is a house in Delanson, Schenectady County, New York. It was listed on the National Register of Historic Places in 1984. The house was originally constructed in 1876 for the station master of the Delaware and Hudson Railroad.

The house was partially destroyed by fire in 1971. The electrical fire started in a barn behind the home. The barn, home of The Grey Barn Antiques, was demolished as was the back portion of the home. Rebuilding and renovation were completed by 1972. Also constructed was a new antique shop behind the home.

The property was covered in a 1984 study of Duanesburg historical resources.

References

Houses completed in 1876
Houses on the National Register of Historic Places in New York (state)
Houses in Schenectady County, New York
National Register of Historic Places in Schenectady County, New York